Valeri Nikolayevich Zubakov (born 30 January 1946) is a Russian professional football coach and a former player.

External links
 

1946 births
Living people
Soviet footballers
Association football defenders
FC Elista players
Soviet football managers
Russian football managers
FC Elista managers
FC Taganrog players